Ghanpokhara  is a village development committee in Lamjung District in the Gandaki Zone of northern-central Nepal.  In 1991, it had a population of 3168 living in 597 individual households.

References

External links
UN map of the municipalities of Lamjung District

Populated places in Lamjung District